Korean Central Presbyterian Church (KCPC) is an Evangelical Christian megachurch located in Centreville, Virginia, situated in the Washington D.C. metropolitan area, affiliated with the Presbyterian Church in America. From a sample of more than 50,000 churches in the United States, KCPC was selected to be one of the 13 "breakout" churches by the Rainer Group. KCPC currently averages 4,600 in attendance per week. It was founded on November 4, 1973. Rev. Eung Yul David Ryoo is the senior pastor of the church.

Korean Central Presbyterian Church is a member congregation of the Presbyterian Church in America.

Mission statement
The mission of KCPC is "Training the Saints to Transform the World" (Ephesians 4:12).

History
The Korean Central Presbyterian Church was founded on November 4, 1973, by Rev. Myung Ho Yoon with 20 Korean-American families. The first service was in his residence at 313 Park Street, N.E. Vienna, Virginia. Rev. Won Sang Lee, who became the succeeding senior pastor, served the congregation for the next 26 years. With its emphasis on becoming a missional community of faith, the congregation grew to over 3,700 members by 2003.

After the retirement of Rev. Won Sang Lee and his installation as pastor emeritus, Rev. Danny C. Ro became the third senior pastor of KCPC starting in October, 2003. Rev. Ro resigned on July 1, 2012, as the senior pastor of KCPC to be the senior pastor of Sarang Community Church of Southern California. A new senior pastor, Rev. Eung-yul David Ryoo was called and installed in 2013 as the church's fourth pastor. In addition to the main campus, KCPC operates the Culpeper Retreat Center in Sperryville, Virginia (13092 Major Brown Dr.).

The English-speaking congregation (KCPC English Ministry) began in the early 1990s to minister to the American-born or raised members of the church. The congregation, having joined the Korean Capital Presbytery, changed its name to Christ Central Presbyterian Church. In recognition of CCPC's particularization as an organized church, KCPC launched a 10 a.m. worship service for its English-speaking congregation (KCPC EC) in 2019. An English Congregation Support Committee (ECSC) was launched in 2020 to systematically pursue KCPC's vision of unity and diversity between the English and Korean speaking congregants under a "one church" model. On January 10, 2021, KCPC launched its KCPC-DC Campus in Arlington, Virginia to reach the unchurched in DC.

Community service

 Supports Fairfax County government by providing building usage for the Providence District staff meetings and the Long Term Care Council monthly meetings.
 Provides a Personal Care Aids Program in Fairfax, Virginia.
 Provides voter registration campaigns.
 Participants in the Senior Navigator Korean project which provides translation of information into Korean for the local Korean community.

See also
 Koreans in Washington, DC

References

External links
 http://www.kcpc.org/ – KCPC website
 https://ec.kcpc.org/ - KCPC English Congregation website
 https://dc.kcpc.org/ - KCPC DC Campus English Congregation website
 https://www.facebook.com/theKCPC – church Facebook page
 http://club.cyworld.com/club/main/club_main.asp?club_id=50658237 – college ministry (Korean-speaking)
 https://web.archive.org/web/20110726214253/http://www.kcpc.org/snl/ – salt & light ministry (English-speaking * transitional ministry for post high school)
 https://www.washingtonpost.com/wp-dyn/content/article/2006/09/03/AR2006090300788.html – news article on Senior Center

Presbyterian Church in America churches in Virginia
Presbyterian megachurches in the United States
Christian organizations established in 1973
Churches in Fairfax County, Virginia
1973 establishments in Virginia